Chino Canyon is a  desert canyon in Riverside County, California, United States. The Palm Springs Aerial Tramway was built in the canyon in 1963 to quickly transport people from the valley floor to the top of the mountain. After it was redesigned in 2000, it became the largest rotating aerial tramway in the world.

The canyon is located in the northern end of the San Jacinto Mountains at the northwestern end of the Coachella Valley.  Its associated stream is a tributary of the Whitewater River.  The upper reaches of the canyon are bordered by Mount San Jacinto State Park, while the lower end terminates near California State Highway 111, and is being encroached by the outskirts of Palm Springs, California. 

In 1942, Chino Canyon was the site of a mid-air collision between American Airlines Flight 28 and a U.S. Army Air Force bomber.

Chino Canyon Creek
Chino Canyon is a desert canyon fed by springs. These produce a waterfall and a stream that peaks out at about 5.4 ft3 per second (0.15 m3 per second). The stream flows under the Aerial Tramway Valley Station and later dries up about 3.5 miles down the canyon.

Notes

Rivers of Riverside County, California
Landforms of Riverside County, California
Canyons and gorges of California
Rivers of Southern California